The Minnesota Golden Gophers football team competes as part of the NCAA Division I Football Bowl Subdivision (FBS), representing the University of Minnesota in the West Division of the Big Ten Conference. Since the establishment of the team in 1882, Minnesota has appeared in 22 bowl games. Included in these games are 2 appearances in the Rose Bowl. The latest bowl appearance for Minnesota came in their win against West Virginia University in the 2021 Guaranteed Rate Bowl. Minnesota wins 28-20 against Syracuse in the Pinstripe Bowl. A win in that game brought Minnesota's all-time bowl record to 11 wins and 12 losses (11-12–0).

Bowl games

References
General

Minnesota Golden Gophers

Minnesota Golden Gophers bowl games